Joseph Frederick Sutter (March 21, 1921 – August 30, 2016) was an American engineer for the Boeing Airplane Company and manager of the design team for the Boeing 747 under Malcolm T. Stamper, the head of the 747 project. Air & Space/Smithsonian magazine has described Sutter as the "father of the 747".

Early life and education
Sutter was born in Seattle, Washington, and grew up in the vicinity of Boeing's Seattle plant. He was of Slovenian descent—his father, Franc Suhadolc (1879–1945) from Dobrova, Slovenia, came to America as a gold prospector. Sutter attended the University of Washington and graduated with a bachelor's degree in aeronautical engineering in 1943.

Career
In 1940, Sutter took a summer job at Boeing Plant 2 while studying aeronautical engineering at the University of Washington. Sutter served as a junior officer aboard the destroyer escort  in the U.S. Navy during World War II.

He was a young U.S. Navy veteran finishing his degree when both Boeing and Douglas offered him jobs. Boeing believed in jet aircraft, so he went there. Former Boeing executive Jim Albaugh believes Douglas would probably own Boeing today if it went otherwise.

At Boeing, Sutter worked on many commercial airplane projects, including the 367-80 "Dash 80", 707, 727 and 737. He eventually became a manager for the new jumbo-sized wide body airplane, the four-engine Boeing 747. As chief engineer, he led the 747 design and build team from conception in 1965 to rollout in 1969. He would become known as the "father of the 747". 

Sutter's final job was as executive vice president for commercial airplane engineering and product development when he retired from Boeing in 1986.

Later life
Sutter served on the Rogers Commission, investigating the Space Shuttle Challenger disaster. He was also selected as a recipient of the International Air Cargo Association's 2002 Hall of Fame Award  and was an engineering sales consultant. As of July 2010, he was a member of the Boeing Senior Advisory Group which was studying the alternatives of a clean sheet replacement of the Boeing 737 or a re-engine of the then-current design, the latter ultimately chosen and later marketed as the Boeing 737 MAX. For decades, he resided in West Seattle. In 2011, on his 90th birthday, Boeing's 40-87 building in Everett, WA, the main engineering building for Boeing Commercial Airplanes division, was renamed the Joe Sutter building. Sutter died on August 30, 2016 at a hospital in Bremerton, Washington from complications of pneumonia, at the age of 95.

Book
Aviation author and historian Jay Spenser worked closely with Sutter for 18 months to write his autobiography, entitled 747: Creating the World's First Jumbo Jet and Other Adventures from a Life in Aviation. It was published by Smithsonian Books/HarperCollins as a hardcover in 2006 and as a paperback in 2007. This book tells of Sutter's childhood and describes his life and 40-year career at Boeing.

The book details Sutter's tenure as chief engineer of the development of the 747 and elaborates on its design, manufacturing, testing, certification, and delivery to the world's airlines. The book also describes subsequent models of the 747 and the two major-derivative updates to the type, the 747-400 of 1989, and the 747-8.

Awards
 1985 United States Medal of Technology award. For his contributions to the development of commercial jet aircraft.

References

External links
Boeing: Remembering an 'Incredible' legend
Boeing: Randy's Journal: Father knows best, a blog entry tributed to Joe Sutter
The Sutter twist – an engineering story, a Wing twist named after him

1921 births
2016 deaths
American aerospace engineers
United States Navy personnel of World War II
American people of Slovenian descent
Boeing people
National Medal of Technology recipients
Writers from Seattle
United States Navy officers
University of Washington College of Engineering alumni